The 2021 Superbike World Championship (known officially as the 2021 Motul FIM Superbike World Championship for sponsorship reasons) was the 34th season of the Superbike World Championship. The championship was won by Toprak Razgatlıoğlu at Mandalika round.

Race calendar and results

The provisional 2021 season calendar was announced on 30 November 2020, with 13 rounds scheduled, and was later revised in response to the COVID-19 pandemic. On 16 February 2021 the Assen round, scheduled for 23–25 April, was postponed to 23–25 July. On 9 March 2021 the Estoril round, scheduled for 7–9 May, was postponed to an unannounced date and the Navarra round—a new event for the championship—was added into the calendar. On 16 April 2021 the Estoril round was confirmed to be held on 28–30 May. On 29 April 2021 the Phillip Island round was cancelled and a round at Most—another new venue—was added into the calendar. On 25 September 2021, it was announced that the Mandalika round was pushed back a week.

Entry list

All entries used Pirelli tyres.

Championship standings
Points were awarded as follows:
Race 1 and Race 2

Superpole Race

Riders' championship

Manufacturers' championship
</noinclude>

Notes

References

External links 

Superbike
Superbike World Championship seasons